NextPage, Inc. was an enterprise software company. Its headquarters were located in Lehi, Utah, later moving to Draper, Utah. NextPage developed a variety of information risk management applications to minimize document risk through information-risk policy enforcement.

The company was founded by Brad Pelo in 1999. Pelo left NextPage in 2007.

NextPage was acquired by Proofpoint, Inc. in 2011.

Management team
As of 2012:
 Darren Lee, CEO
 James Seeley, Vice President Sales
 Wayne Nelson, Vice President Engineering

References

External links
 NextPage official website archives:
 
 
 

Software companies based in Utah
Companies based in Utah
1999 establishments in Utah
Defunct software companies of the United States